Monterey Media Inc. (formerly The Monterey Movie Company) started as a home video company founded in 1982 by Scott Mansfield. It was initially financed by Noel C. Bloom, and the titles were distributed by the Family Home Entertainment subsidiary of Caballero Control Corporation. Monterey is the second sub-label of NCB Entertainment, after FHE.

In 1987, Len Levy moved to Fries Home Video, an upstart distributor, taking its Monterey line with them, after cutting ties with International Video Entertainment, which received all 53 titles after five years. That year, in October, the Monterey Movie Company had signed a 22-title agreement with Forum Home Video, to launch its new Phoenix Video label and Scott Mansfield will provide the package, with Forum Home Video handling U.S. distribution of its titles, and the cassettes would range from $19.98-34.98.

After many years the company has now expanded from home video into independent theatrical distribution, film festivals, and other venues including television, digital delivery and home entertainment markets.

Its first release was Deadly Games, a film made by Mansfield. Mansfield then released more titles under the Monterey label; early releases included a Dorsey Burnette tribute concert, a Sandahl Bergman aerobic dance video, Dynamite Chicken, a concert by The Tubes, Oh, Alfie!, The Werewolf of Washington, Can She Bake a Cherry Pie?, And Nothing But the Truth, Tomorrow, The Children of Sanchez, and Autumn Born. The company was also the exclusive distributor for All Grateful Dead concert videos/ DVDs for over 20 years, including The Grateful Dead Movie and Dead Ahead.

Currently, they distribute their films at festivals and events, in theaters, and on DVD and VOD, including feature films, documentaries, self-help videos, and PBS programs.

In 2019, Monterey was acquired by BayView Entertainment.

Selected theatrical releases 

 10 Questions for the Dalai Lama
 Childless (2015)
 A Farewell to Fools (2014)
 Approaching Midnight (2013)
 A Beautiful Now (2015)
 Between Us (2012 film) (2012)
 The Blue Butterfly
 Bracelet of Bordeaux (2009)
 Bringing Up Bobby (2012)
 Canopy (2013)
 The Cellar Door (2008)
 The Citizen (2013)
 The Cry (2008)
 Endgame (2010)
 The Endless Summer (1966)
 Eye of the Dolphin (2007)
 Girl on a Bicycle (film) (2014)
 The Girl on the Train (2013)
 Gooby (2009)
 Half of a Yellow Sun (film) (2014)
 Harvest (2011)
 Hey Hey It's Esther Blueburger (2010)
 Home (2009)
 How to Be a Serial Killer (2009)
 Humble Pie (2007)
 I Am Comic (2010)
 I Kissed a Vampire (2012).
 Karla (2007)
 Keyhole (film) (2012)
 The Kitchen (2012 film) (2012)
 Leonie (film) (2013)
 The Lesser Blessed (2009)
 Local Color (film) (2009)
 Looking for Palladin (2011)
 Lovely, Still (2012)
 Meadowoods (2010)
 No God, No Master (2014)
 Nobelity (2006)
 One Peace at a Time (2009)
 Peel: The Peru Project (2006)
 The Red Baron (film) (2008)
 Redwood Highway (film) (2014)
 Restitution (2011)
 Ripple Effect (2007)

References

External links
 

Companies based in Thousand Oaks, California
Home video companies of the United States